Richard Hanna may refer to:

 Richard T. Hanna (1914–2001), U.S. Representative from California
 Richard L. Hanna (1951–2020), U.S. Representative from New York